A serenic, or antiaggressive agent, is a type of drug which reduces the capacity for irritability and aggression.

Examples
The recreational drug MDMA ("ecstasy") and a variety of related drugs have been described as empathogen-entactogens, or simply as entactogens. These agents possess serenic and empathy-increasing properties in addition to their euphoriant effects, and have been associated with increased sociability, friendliness, and feelings of closeness to others as well as emotional empathy and prosocial behavior. The entactogenic effects of these drugs are thought to be related to their ability to temporarily increase the levels of certain brain chemicals, including serotonin, dopamine, and, particularly, oxytocin. 

Certain other serotonergic drugs, such as 5-HT1A receptor agonists, also increase oxytocin levels and may possess serenic properties as well. The phenylpiperazine mixed 5-HT1A and 5-HT1B receptor agonists eltoprazine, fluprazine, and batoprazine have been described based on animal research as serenics. 

Agonists and antagonists of the receptors for the endogenous hormones oxytocin and vasopressin, respectively, have been shown to decrease aggressive behavior in scientific research, implicating them in the normal regulation of pathways involving aggressive behavior in the brain. Certain neurosteroids, such as allopregnanolone, also appear to play a role in the regulation of aggression, including, notably, sexually-dimorphic aggressive behavior. The sex hormones testosterone and estradiol also regulate aggression. 

Nicotinic acetylcholine receptors within the CNS, specifically α7 homopentameric receptors, are implicated in the regulation of aggression. The serenic effect of nicotine is well documented both in laboratory animals and humans, and, conversely, nicotinic receptor antagonists and nicotine withdrawal are associated with irritability and aggression. Additionally, nicotinic receptors are required for rabies virus entry into a neuron, and the dysfunction of these neurons is implicated in the rabies-associated aggression.

References 

Psychoactive drugs